The Chengdu Art Museum is an art museum with a collection of artworks, based in the city of Chengdu, Sichuan, China. It is run by the Chengdu Art Academy.

History
The Chengdu Art Academy was founded in 1980 within the Chengdu Culture Park. In 1983, it moved to historic buildings at 59 Zhijishi Street. The style of the buildings is a typical quadrangle of western Sichuan historic houses dating from the late Qing dynasty. In 2007, the premises were approved as a Sichuan Provincial Heritage Conservation Site. A project to protect and maintain the buildings was completed in 2008. The buildings were opened by the academy as the Chengdu Art Museum. During October to December 2020, the historic museum buildings were closed to the public for maintenance.

On 6 November 2021, at the Tianfu Art Park and at the start of the 2021 Chengdu Biennale, the Chengdu Art Academy launched two new contemporary art museum buildings in the park, namely the Chengdu Tianfu Art Museum and the Chengdu Museum of Contemporary Art, forming a new focus for the Chengdu Art Museum.

See also
 Chengdu Art Academy
 Chengdu Museum of Contemporary Art
 Chengdu Tianfu Art Museum
 Tianfu Art Park

References

Museums with year of establishment missing
Art museums and galleries in China
Museums in Chengdu
Arts in Chengdu